Harutyun (Gevork) Manuki Alamdaryan ( 1795, Astrakhan - 1834, Nor Nakhijevan) was an Armenian poet and teacher.

Biography 
In 1813 he was invited to Moscow where he became the first director of Lazarian seminary. In 1824-1830 he was the director of Nersisian Armenian school in Tiflis. Being a supporter of Nerses Ashtaraketsi, in 1830 he was exiled to Haghpat Monastery. In 1832-1834 he lived in Holy Cross Church, Nakhichevan on Don, where he was killed.

Alamdaryan was the teacher of Khachatur Abovian and Stepanos Nazarian. He is an author of many poems and an Armenian-Russian vocabulary.

Sources
 
 

1795 births
1834 deaths
19th-century Armenian poets
Armenian male poets
19th-century male writers